Gorłówko  is a village in the administrative district of Gmina Stare Juchy, within Ełk County, Warmian-Masurian Voivodeship, in northern Poland. 

References

Villages in Ełk County